Landmarks is an album by the American jazz saxophonist Joe Lovano recorded in 1990 and released on the Blue Note label.

Reception
The AllMusic review by Scott Yanow stated: "Although the title of this CD makes it sound as if tenor-saxophonist Joe Lovano was performing veteran jazz classics on this date, all but one of the ten songs played by his quintet are actually Lovano originals... Lovano is consistently creative during the modern mainstream music".

Track listing
All compositions by Joe Lovano except as indicated
 "The Owl and the Fox" - 3:05 
 "Primal Dance" - 6:17 
 "Emperor Jones" - 5:13 
 "Landmarks Along the Way" - 5:42 
 "Street Talk" - 2:30 
 "Here and Now" - 5:40 
 "I Love Music" (Hale Smith, Emil Boyd) - 5:19 
 "Where Hawks Fly" - 6:13 
 "Thanksgiving" - 6:35 
 "Dig This" - 8:41

Personnel
Joe Lovano – tenor saxophone
John Abercrombie - guitar 
Kenny Werner – piano
Marc Johnson – bass
Bill Stewart – drums

References

External links
 

Blue Note Records albums
Joe Lovano albums
1990 albums